The Para-bobsleigh competition at the IBSF World Championships 2023 was held on 2 and 3 February 2023.

Results
The first two runs were started on 2 February at 09:00 and the last two runs on 3 February at 09:00.

References

Para-bobsleigh